Charlie Brown's All Stars! is the second prime-time animated television special based upon the popular comic strip Peanuts, by Charles M. Schulz. It was the second such TV special (following A Charlie Brown Christmas) to be produced by Lee Mendelson and Bill Melendez (who also directed), and originally aired on CBS on June 8, 1966, with annual reairings on CBS through 1971.

Plot summary 

After Charlie Brown's baseball team loses their first game of the season, his players quit. Linus meets Charlie Brown with good news: Mr. Hennessey, the operator of the local hardware store, is offering to sponsor Charlie Brown's baseball team, place them in an organized league, and even buy them new uniforms.

The excitement gets the better of Charlie Brown, and he eagerly tells the team the good news. Lucy then states that if Charlie Brown can really get the team uniforms, they will give him another chance and return to the team. Later at home, Charlie Brown receives a phone call from Mr. Hennessey and is told that the league does not allow girls or dogs to play baseball. Charlie Brown tries to reason with him, but Mr. Hennessey replies that they are the league's rules, not his. Unwilling to sacrifice his friends, Charlie Brown has no choice but to decline Mr. Hennessey's offer.

Moments later, Charlie Brown relays the bad news to Linus, who tells him that Lucy and the team will most likely be angry with his decision. However, Charlie Brown has an idea: He will not tell them until after the next game, figuring their lifted spirits will drive them to a great win. Linus says this may not be a good idea, but Charlie Brown feels it will work. The game starts off slowly, but as it picks up, the team begins to play spectacularly. Inspired by Snoopy successfully stealing second, third, and home, Charlie Brown attempts the same thing in the bottom of the ninth inning, successfully stealing second and third. However, Charlie Brown attempts to tie the game by stealing home, only to be thrown out at the plate, ending the game with yet another loss, much to everyone's frustration.

Lucy and several others tell Charlie Brown that if it were not for the uniforms and the league deal, they would quit. Charlie Brown then tells the team (leaving out the reasons why he did it) that he told Mr. Hennessey that the deal was off. This causes the team to yell at Charlie Brown and storm off. As the girls complain about their misfortune and Snoopy is shown sharing their disgust, Linus tells them the real reason why Charlie Brown declined the offer. Both Linus and Schroeder berate the girls for their selfishness, pointing out that Charlie Brown was not willing to sacrifice them for the uniforms. This causes everyone to feel terrible. They are uncertain what to do until Lucy comes up with an idea to make up for the insults (make a special baseball uniform for Charlie Brown). Unfortunately for Linus, Lucy sees that Linus's security blanket is the only material available. Then Lucy, the other girls, and Snoopy use the blanket to create a baseball uniform. Linus (who stands shocked into silence on a chair) is used as a dress dummy. 

The team presents the newly made uniform shirt (completed with the words "Our Manager" on the front) to Charlie Brown, who is very happy about it. He is determined that his team will win the next day's baseball game, but it rains, so the game is canceled. However, Charlie Brown is standing in the rain on the pitcher's mound, where Linus finds him and tells him that nobody will be coming to the field. When Charlie Brown asks Linus why he is looking at him nervously, he (Linus) wails and tells him that his uniform was made out of his blanket. At that point, Charlie offers his best friend the "tail" of his uniform to press against his cheek, which he does with his thumb in his mouth, and they stay like that throughout the closing credits.

Cast 
 Peter Robbins as Charlie Brown
 Christopher Shea as Linus van Pelt
 Tracy Stratford as Lucy van Pelt
 Cathy Steinberg as Sally Brown
 Bill Melendez as Snoopy
 Sally Dryer as Frieda
 Glenn Mendelson as Schroeder
 Geoffrey Ornstein as Pig-Pen
 Lynn Vanderlip as Patty
 Kip DeFaria as Shermy
 Karen Mendelson as Violet
5 also appears, but is silent. This is also the first Peanuts special to not feature Tracy Stratford as Lucy van Pelt; she was replaced with Sally Dryer, who voiced Violet in the previous special. This is also the first special where Karen Mendelson voices Violet.

Music score
The music for Charlie Brown's All Stars! was composed and conducted by Vince Guaraldi and performed by the Vince Guaraldi Sextet.

"Charlie's Run"
"Charlie Brown and His All-Stars"
"Baseball Theme"
"Baseball Theme" (brass version)
"Baseball Theme" (guitar version)
"All-Stars Theme" (variation of "Oh, Good Grief")
"All-Stars Theme" (reprise)
"Air Music" (aka "Surfin' Snoopy")
"Pebble Beach" (brass version)
"All-Stars Theme" (second reprise)
"Baseball Theme" (reprise)
"Air Music"
"Baseball Theme" (reprise, brass version)
"Trumpet Fanfare"
"All-Stars Theme" (third reprise)
"Air Music"
"Baseball Theme" (second reprise, brass version)
"Rain, Rain, Go Away"
"All-Stars Theme" (fourth reprise, end credit)

No official soundtrack for Charlie Brown's All Stars! was released, although select music cues have been made available on several compilation albums:
 "Air Music" appeared on Charlie Brown's Holiday Hits (1998), as "Surfin' Snoopy". The song was used in A Charlie Brown Christmas for later broadcasts when Snoopy expeditiously decorates his doghouse for Christmas.
A variation of "Rain, Rain, Go Away" appeared on Oh Good Grief! (1968).

End Credits
 Created and Written by: Charles M. Schulz
 Original Score Composed and Conducted by: Vince Guaraldi
 Graphic Blandishment by: 
 Ed Levitt,   
 Bernard Gruver, 
 Ruth Kissane, 
 Dean Spille, 
 Frank Smith, 
 Bob Carlson        John Walker
 Rudy Zamora        Ed Love
 Herman Cohen       Beverly Robbins
 Reuben Timmons     Eleanor Warren
 Russ Von Neida     Faith Kovaleski
 Editing: Robert T. Gillis
 Assisted by: Steven Melendez
 Sound by: Producers' Sound Service
 Camera: Nick Vasu
 Executive Producer: Lee Mendelson
 Produced and Directed by: Bill Melendez

Book vs. television special
A book about the television special was published shortly after it initially aired. In the book, Charlie Brown tells his teammates "we don't need them," then turns and walks away as they verbally abuse him until Linus defends him, in this instance without giving a reason. In the book, Schroeder is not shown berating the girls and Snoopy along with Linus, although he does in the television show: "Those uniforms meant just as much to Charlie Brown as they did to you. Probably more!" At the end, Linus just comes up to Charlie wearing the new uniform on the pitchers mound and Charlie wordlessly lets him use his shirt tail to hold up against his cheek.

Home media
The special was first released on RCA's SelectaVision CED format in 1983 as part of the "A Charlie Brown Festival Vol. IV" compilation. It was also released on VHS and Betamax by Media Home Entertainment in 1984, along with It's Magic, Charlie Brown. It would be released again by its kids subdivision Hi-Tops Video in 1988. Paramount Home Media Distribution released it on VHS on January 9, 1996, along with It's Spring Training, Charlie Brown. Charlie Brown's All Stars! was released in DVD format on March 2, 2004, grouped with the similarly themed It's Spring Training, Charlie Brown (1992) and Lucy Must Be Traded, Charlie Brown (2003). On July 7, 2009, it was released in remastered form as part of the DVD box set, Peanuts 1960's Collection. It was again released as part of the 4K edition of It's the Great Pumpkin, Charlie Brown in 2017.

Cancelled video game adaption 
A cancelled video game titled Charlie Brown's All Stars for the PlayStation 2 and PlayStation Portable was likely going to be an adaption of the special. It was developed simultaneously with Snoopy vs. the Red Baron by FarSight Studios and was going to be published by Namco Bandai Games. It was going to release in the spring of 2007; however, it was cancelled due to an excessive amount of projects by the studio and lack of staff.

Production notes
The scene where Snoopy is surfing is later reanimated in Snoopy Come Home, which was later re-used inYou're a Good Man, Charlie Brown, and Snoopy's Reunion.
Like A Charlie Brown Christmas before it, this special also had sponsoring from Coca-Cola (and Dolly Madison on a repeat after 1966), which was later edited out from later broadcasts and video/DVD releases. The original music cue "Surfin' Snoopy" was later used in a re-broadcast of "A Charlie Brown Christmas".
This is the first non-holiday-oriented Peanuts special.
 Even though Linus knows why Charlie Brown didn't get the uniforms, he can be seen getting mad and yelling at Charlie Brown with the others. He then explains to them why Charlie Brown turned down the offer.
 Linus' blanket is replaced before the next special.
 This special was originally announced as Good Grief, Charlie Brown and was advertised as such in The New York Times.

Reception
The special was nominated for a Primetime Emmy Award for Outstanding Children's Program in 1967, along with It's the Great Pumpkin, Charlie Brown. It lost to Hanna-Barbera's Jack and the Beanstalk, starring Gene Kelly.

References

External links
 

Peanuts television specials
CBS television specials
1960s American television specials
1960s animated television specials
Television shows directed by Bill Melendez
1966 television specials
American baseball films
Baseball animation